Talia Rose Shire (née Coppola; born April 25, 1946) is an American actress who played roles as Connie Corleone in The Godfather films and Adrian Balboa in the Rocky series. For her work in The Godfather Part II and Rocky, Shire was nominated for  Academy Awards for Best Supporting Actress and Best Actress, respectively, and for the Golden Globe Award for Best Actress in a Drama for her role in Rocky.

Life
Shire was born Talia Rose Coppola in Lake Success, New York, in 1946, the only daughter of Italia (née Pennino) and arranger/composer Carmine Coppola. Her paternal grandparents came to the United States from Bernalda, Basilicata. Her maternal grandfather, popular Italian composer Francesco Pennino, emigrated from Naples, Italy. She is the sister of director and producer Francis Ford Coppola and academic August Coppola, the aunt of actor Nicolas Cage and director Sofia Coppola, and the niece of composer and conductor Anton Coppola. 

She has three children. Her son Matthew Orlando Shire is the child of her first marriage to composer David Shire. Her other sons, actors/musicians Jason and Robert, are from her second marriage, to the film producer Jack Schwartzman.

Career
Shire portrayed Connie Corleone in The Godfather and its sequels and was nominated for the Academy Award for Best Supporting Actress for her performance in The Godfather Part II (1974). For her portrayal of Adrian Pennino, the love interest of Rocky Balboa in Rocky (1976), she won the New York Film Critics Circle Award for Best Supporting Actress, the National Board of Review Award for Best Supporting Actress, and was nominated for both the Golden Globe Award for Best Actress in a Drama and the Academy Award for Best Actress. In addition to reprising her Adrian role in four Rocky sequels, Shire has appeared in such films as Kiss the Bride (2002), I Heart Huckabees (2004), and Homo Erectus (2007).

Filmography

See also
Coppola family tree

References

External links

 

1946 births
Living people
American people of Italian descent
People of Campanian descent
People of Lucanian descent
American film actresses
Coppola family
Actresses from New York (state)
20th-century American actresses
21st-century American actresses
People from Lake Success, New York